Mike "Huey" Huwiler (born January 4, 1972) is an American former soccer midfielder who was a member of the United States Olympic team at the 1992 Summer Olympics and the 1996 D.C. United championship team.

Playing career

High school and college
Huwiler grew up in Wauwatosa, Wisconsin and attended Marquette University High School where he was a two-time Parade Magazine All American as a high school soccer player.  After graduating from high school, Huwiler attended the University of Virginia.  He spent three seasons, 1990–1992, on the Caveliers’ soccer team under future national team coach Bruce Arena.  In 1991 and 1992, the Caveliers took the NCAA championship. While he considered pursuing a culinary career, he ultimately decided to turn professional with the Richmond Kickers of USISL.

Professional
In 1993, Huwiler signed with the expansion Richmond Kickers (USISL).  He spent two seasons with the Kickers.  In 1994, he joined the Chicago Power of the National Professional Soccer League for the 1994–1995 indoor season.

On March 8, 1995, D.C. United of Major League Soccer (MLS) named Huwiler as a Discovery Player.  While United signed Huwiler in 1995, MLS did not hold its first season until 1996.  In the meantime, the league and United loaned Huwiler to the Atlanta Ruckus of the A-League for the 1995 season.  That season, Huwiler was an integral part of the Ruckus team which made it to the A-League championship series only to fall to the Seattle Sounders.  In 1996, he joined United for the team, and league's, first season.  However, he played only five games before suffering a season-ending injury.  On August 19, 1996, United loaned Huwiler to the Richmond Kickers for the remainder of the season, then waived him on November 7, 1996.  However, he was on the roster for United's MLS and Open cup championships that season.

On March 25, 1997, he moved to the Milwaukee Rampage (A-League) for the 1997 and 1998 seasons.  In 1997, Huwiler added an A-League championship when the Rampage defeated the Carolina Dynamo.

Huwiler retired from playing professionally after the 1998 season.  His retirement was precipitated when Carson White of the Raleigh Flyers broke Huwiler's leg in the final game of the season.  White was shown straight red for the reckless tackle.  He did continue to play amateur ball and in 2000 was a member of the U.S. Amateur Cup championship Milwaukee Bavarians.

Olympic team
Huwiler was selected for the U.S. team at the 1992 Summer Olympics.  The team went 1-1-1 and failed to make the second round. Huwiler was an integral part of the squad, starting all 3 games in Barcelona, and recognized as one of the top performers for the U.S. Team.

Coaching
In 1998, Huwiler joined the coaching ranks when he was hired as the head coach of the Milwaukee Area Technical College men's soccer team.  He compiled a 14-7-1 record over his two seasons with the team.  In 2002, Marquette University High School hired Huwiler as its junior varsity boys soccer team coach.

Personal
Huwiler and his wife Molly have three children.  They reside in his hometown of Milwaukee, Wisconsin and works for M&I Corporation.  In July 2003, Huwiler was diagnosed with testicular cancer.  After multiple surgeries and aggressive chemotherapy, Huwiler emerged as a cancer survivor.

References

External links

 MLS Stats

1972 births
Living people
USISL players
Richmond Kickers players
American Professional Soccer League players
Atlanta Silverbacks players
National Professional Soccer League (1984–2001) players
Chicago Power players
D.C. United players
Milwaukee Rampage players
Olympic soccer players of the United States
Footballers at the 1992 Summer Olympics
USL First Division players
Virginia Cavaliers men's soccer players
Milwaukee Bavarians players
Soccer players from Wisconsin
Milwaukee Area Technical College people
Major League Soccer players
United States men's under-23 international soccer players
People from Wauwatosa, Wisconsin
American soccer players
Association football midfielders